Adikkurippu is a 1989 Malayalam-language legal thriller film, written by S. N. Swamy and directed by K. Madhu. It stars Mammootty in the lead role, who plays the role of an advocate. The movie was praised for introducing a new theme in Malayalam by depicting the life of a castaway portrayed by Jagathy, who lands in legal problems that were rare in Malayalam movies during that time. The film is loosely based on the missing ship owned by Kerala Shipping Corporation, MV Kairali. S. N. Swamy has recognized the film as his favorite.

Cast
 Mammootty as Adv. Bhaskara Pillai
 Jagathy Sreekumar as Basheer
 Urvashi as Adv. Geetha
 Sukumaran as Chief Minister / Mr.X 
Lalu Alex as Captain John Samuel
Sreenath as S. I. Raju
Janardhanan as Williams
Vijayaraghavan as Mohammed Ali
Jose Prakash as Menon
Lizy as Veena, Bhaskara Pillai's Sister
K. P. A. C. Sunny as Karthikeyan
Meena as Bhaskara Pillai's Mother
Babu Namboothiri as Public Prosecutor APP
 Jagadish as Bappootty (Cameo)
 Prathapachandran as Venkata Swamy
 K. P. A. C. Azeez as Judge
 Kollam Thulasi as District Collector
 Kothuku Nanappan as Aasan 
 Sankaradi as Advocate Krishnakurup
 Paravoor Bharathan as Pillai
 Santhakumari as Basheer's Mother
Vijayan as Home Minister Keshavan
Nandhu as Dentist's Assistant
M. S. Thripunithura as Customs Officer
Murali Mohan as Doctor
Nassar Latheef as Sunny
Suma Jayaram as Basheer's Sister
Vijayan Peringode as Ship Worker

Plot
The story revolves around the castaway Basheer (Jagathy Sreekumar), who partially lost his memory. The captain of the ship (Lalu Alex), who found him would like to hand Basheer over to the relatives post anchoring in Kochi. However, Basheer does not possess any documents proving his identity and citizenship, and so there were challenges involved in getting him deported. Advocate Bhaskara Pillai (Mammootty) tries a few plans. Things get thrilling as there were murder attempts on Basheer. Adv. Bhaskara Pillai comes to his rescue and succeeds in tracing the identity of Basheer and finally finds the people behind the play.

References

External links
 
 Adikkurippu at the Malayalam Movie Database

1980s Malayalam-language films
Films scored by Shyam (composer)
Films directed by K. Madhu